Euvola vogdesi is a species of bivalve belonging to the family Pectinidae.

The species is found in Northern and Central America.

References

Pectinidae
Bivalves described in 1906